Kokaiinum is the fifth studio album by Danish death metal band Illdisposed. The title is taken from the Arnold Schwarzenegger film Red Heat.

Track listing 
 "A Warm Welcome" – 3:24	
 "Just Like a Clockwork" – 3:27
 "Richard Scarry" – 3:35	
 "Illdisposed" – 3:47	
 "Forever Young 2001" – 4:25	
 "Intellargent" – 4:06	
 "Kokaiinum" – 4:23	
 "A Girl and Her Boss" – 2:52	
 "Fear Bill Gates" – 5:02

Illdisposed albums
2001 albums
Diehard Music albums